The 1983 Chicago Marathon was the 7th running of the annual marathon race in Chicago, United States and was held on October 16. The elite men's race was won by Kenya's Joseph Nzau in a time of 2:09:44.3 hours and the women's race was won by Portugal's Rosa Mota in 2:31:12. Nzau edged Britain's Hugh Jones by half a second in a tight finish. A total of 5237 runners finished the race, an increase of nearly 600 from the previous year.

Results

Men

Women

References

Results. Association of Road Racing Statisticians. Retrieved 2020-05-25.

External links 
 Official website

1983
Chicago
1980s in Chicago
1983 in Illinois
Chicago Marathon
Chicago Marathon